Doug Koop (born 22 July 1960) is a former Australian rules footballer who played with South Melbourne, North Melbourne and Melbourne in the Victorian Football League (VFL).

Koop, a utility, played 15 games in three seasons at South Melbourne. He had perhaps his best match in 1980, against Carlton at Princes Park, when he had 22 disposals and kicked four goals.

He spent 1982 to 1984 in the SANFL playing with Woodville and then returned to the VFL at North Melbourne. Koop only made two appearances for North Melbourne in 1985 and just three more in 1986 before switching to Melbourne.

It was at Melbourne that he got selected most regularly and despite playing in both of his club's semi-final wins of 1987 and 1988, he missed each of the preliminary finals.

Koop is coach of the Officer Football club, previously having coached Cranbourne and Frankston YCW.

References

1960 births
Sydney Swans players
North Melbourne Football Club players
Melbourne Football Club players
Woodville Football Club players
Casey Demons players
Australian rules footballers from Victoria (Australia)
Living people